US Post Office—Springville is a historic post office building located at Springville in Erie County, New York. It was designed and built 1936–1937, and is one of a number of post offices in New York State designed by the Office of the Supervising Architect of the Treasury Department under Louis A. Simon.  The building is in the Colonial Revival style and is a one-story brick structure crowned by a square, flat-topped cupola.  The lobby features a mural by Victoria Hutson Huntley painted in 1938, and titled "Fiddler's Green."

It was listed on the National Register of Historic Places in 1989.

References

External links
US Post Office-Springville - U.S. National Register of Historic Places on Waymarking.com
Western New York Heritage Press: Springville, NY Post Office Mural photo

Springville, NY
Government buildings completed in 1936
Colonial Revival architecture in New York (state)
Springville
National Register of Historic Places in Erie County, New York